Safonovsky (masculine), Safonovskaya (feminine), or Safonovskoye (neuter) is the name of several rural localities in Russia:
Safonovsky, Oryol Oblast, a settlement in Znamensky Selsoviet of Znamensky District of Oryol Oblast
Safonovsky, Volgograd Oblast, a khutor in Rossoshinsky Selsoviet of Uryupinsky District of Volgograd Oblast
Safonovskaya, a village in Nizhneslobodsky Selsoviet of Vozhegodsky District of Vologda Oblast